The 2013 PGA Tour Canada season ran from June 6 to September 15 and consists of nine official tournaments. This was the 44th season of PGA Tour Canada (previously known as the Canadian Professional Golf Tour), and the first under the "PGA Tour Canada" name. On October 18, 2012, the Canadian Tour and the U.S. PGA Tour announced that they had reached an agreement by which the PGA Tour would take over the Canadian circuit.

Schedule
The following table lists official events during the 2013 season.

Order of Merit
The Order of Merit was based on prize money won during the season, calculated in Canadian dollars. The top five players on the tour earned status to play on the 2014 Web.com Tour.

Notes

References

External links
PGA Tour Canada official site

PGA Tour Canada
PGA Tour Canada